Ali Valiyev (27 February 1901 – 2 February 1983) was a prose-writer, the member of Union of Azerbaijani Writers, Azerbaijan People's Writer (June 9, 1974), the State reward prize-winner named after M. F. Akhundov.

Biography
He studied in Shusha Public School (1923), Baku Central Public Council School (1924–25) and lecturers group. He entered to the history and community faculty of Azerbaijan State Pedagogical Institute in 1928. His stories have been published in "Revolution and culture", "Assault", "In the literature front" and other newspapers and magazines. In 1930 he was appointed chief of the publicity and agitation department of Aghdam region party committee and editor of "Kolxoz sədası" newspaper. He has worked actively on party field in Lachin, Gubadli regions and Naxchivan province, at the same time he was responsible editor of "East door" and "Soviet Kurdustan" newspapers until 1937. In 1942-43 he worked in chargeable positions in Azerbaijan Art Workers Union, Baku region Executive Committee. Hence he worked as deputy editor and liable editor in "Communist" newspaper. For a time he worked as responsible secretary in Writers Union and as chargeable editor in "Azerbaijan" magazine and he engaged with literature till the end of his life.

Creativity
He is one of outstanding figures of the Azerbaijani national literature. In his works he tried to reflect the public mood of the Azerbaijani village. In creativity of A. Valiyev that knows people's lives better the local color was reflected with all its richness. He is the author of "Travel of God", "Grandmother's spinning-wheel", "Snowy mountains", "Friends", "Evidence", "Gulshan", "Flowery", "Friends of heart", "Anaqiz", "A pair of star", "A pair of peregrine", "Tea-urn smokes", "Crane range", "Stars of time", "Worried mAn", "Past days", "Madar's epos" books. He died in 1983.

Selected works
 Allahın səyahəti (Travel of God)1930
 Nənəmin cəhrəsi (Grandmother's spinning-wheel)1930
 Qarlı dağlar (Snowy mountains)1938
 Dostlar (Friends)1939
 Ordenli çoban (Shepherd with order)1939
 Qəhrəman (Hero)1940
 Sübut (Evidence)1941
 Cəbhə hekayələri (The front stories)1942
 Gülşən (Gulshan)1953
 Çiçəkli (Flowery)1955
 Turaclıya gedən yol (The way gone to Turajli)1961
 Anaqiz 1965
 Bir cüt ulduz (A pair of star)1967
 Bir cüt tərlan (A pair of peregrine)1968
 Seçilmiş əsərləri (Selected works) 6 volumes, Baku,Azərnəşr-1968,12 000 copies
 Seçilmiş əsərləri (Selected works) stories, novels 6 volumes, Azerbaijan State Book House-1969.12 000 copies
 Gülşən və ürək dostları (Gulshan and her close friends)1970
 Ürək dostları (Close friends)1970
 Samovar tüstülənir (Tea-urn smokes)1971
 Durna qatarı (Crane range)1972
 Budağın xatirələri (Budag's memories)1974
 Zamanın ulduzları (Stars of time)1976
 Narahat adam (Worried man)1978
 Oçerklər (Essays)1978
 Ötən günlər (Past days)1981
 Madarın dastanı (Madar's epos)1988

References

External links
 Xalq yazıçısı Əli Vəliyev İctisuda.Kəlbəcər 1975-ci il
 Əli Vəliyev (film, 2011)
 Əli Vəliyev:"QARABAĞDA QALAN İZLƏR"
 KULT.AZ » XALQ YAZIÇISI ƏLI VƏLIYEV ANILACAQ

1901 births
1983 deaths
Communist Party of the Soviet Union members
Recipients of the Order of Lenin
Recipients of the Order of the Red Banner of Labour
Azerbaijani male writers
Burials at Alley of Honor